Ann Davey (born 1963) is an English female former track and road cyclist.

Cycling career
Davey became a British track champion after winning the British National Individual Sprint Championships in 1981.

References

1963 births
British female cyclists
British track cyclists
Living people
20th-century British women